Kauikeaouli Hale is a district courthouse for the Island of Oahu in Hawaii.

Its lower floors house the courts of the first circuit, covering the City and County of Honolulu, and upper floors have offices of some support departments of the Hawaii Supreme Court. It is adjacent to the Hawaii State Art Museum.

In the Hawaiian language, hale means "house" and Kauikeaouli was the birth name of the Kingdom of Hawaii’s King Kamehameha III (1813–1854).  The art displayed at Kauikeaouli Hale includes:

 Aged Tree, a 1976 wood, copper and bronze sculpture by Satoru Abe
 Bear and Cubs, a 1973 black granite sculpture by Benny Bufano
 Hawaiian Mountain Series I, a 1974 ceramic sculpture by Bob Flint
 My Father's Eyes Have Seen What I Dreamed, a 1971 ceramic, wood and resin sculpture by Donald Harvey
 Family Structure, a 1971 wood sculpture by Ken Shutt

References

Courthouses in Hawaii
Buildings and structures in Honolulu